Dennis James Sorrell (7 October 1940 – 10 November 2019) was an English professional footballer who played as a left-half in the Football League for Leyton Orient and Chelsea. He also played for a number of teams in non-League football, most notably Romford.

He was the uncle of former Maidstone United, Colchester United and Barnet footballer Tony Sorrell.

Sorrell died on 10 November 2019, aged 79, following a long battle with illness.

References

1940 births
2019 deaths
Footballers from Lambeth
English footballers
Association football midfielders
Woodford Town F.C. (1937) players
Leyton Orient F.C. players
Chelsea F.C. players
Romford F.C. players
English Football League players